The 2005–06 Connecticut Huskies men's basketball team represented the University of Connecticut in the 2005–06 collegiate men's basketball season. The Huskies completed the season with a 30–4 overall record. The Huskies were members of the Big East Conference where they finished with a 14–2 record and were the regular season champions. They made it to the Elite Eight in the 2006 NCAA Division I men's basketball tournament. The Huskies played their home games at Harry A. Gampel Pavilion in Storrs, Connecticut and the Hartford Civic Center in Hartford, Connecticut, and they were led by twentieth-year head coach Jim Calhoun.

Recruiting class

Roster
Listed are the student athletes who are members of the 2005–2006 team.

Schedule

|-
!colspan=10| Exhibition

|-
!colspan=10| Regular season

|-
!colspan=10| Big East tournament

|-
!colspan=11|NCAA tournament

NCAA basketball tournament
Their Elite Eight matchup found themselves facing the George Mason Patriots. The Patriots were able to defeat the top-seeded Huskies, 86–84 in overtime, in what is recognized as one of the most memorable games in tournament history. 
East
Connecticut 72, Albany 59
Connecticut 87, Kentucky 83
Connecticut 98, Washington 92
George Mason 86, Connecticut 84

Team players drafted into the NBA

Denham Brown was also drafted in the second round by the Seattle SuperSonics

See also
Connecticut Huskies men's basketball
2006 NCAA Division I men's basketball tournament

References

UConn Huskies men's basketball seasons
Connecticut Huskies
Connecticut
2005 in sports in Connecticut
2006 in sports in Connecticut